Grevillea victoriae, also known as royal grevillea or mountain grevillea, is a  shrub which is endemic to south-eastern New South Wales and mountainous parts of Victoria in Australia.

Description
Grevillea victoriae is a shrub that grows to between 0.2 and 4 metres in height. It has obovate to ovate leaves that range between 1.5 and 14 cm in length and 0.5 to 4.5 cm in width. Pendant clusters of red or orange flowers appear in spring and summer.

Taxonomy
The species was first formally described by Victorian Government Botanist Ferdinand von Mueller, his description published in  Transactions of the Philosophical Society of Victoria in 1855. Mueller discovered the species when he climbed to the plateau of Mount Buffalo in 1853. He described it as "a truly majestic plant, when, by descending into the vallies it assumes a height of 12 feet or more." The specific epithet victoriae was named for Queen Victoria.

Grevillea victoriae complex

In 1993 Don McGillivray published an outline of 11 races of Grevillea victoriae as well as an associated description of unassigned specimens prompting fellow botanists to take a closer look at the Grevillea victoriae complex. The following year, Grevillea hockingsii from Queensland and G. mollis from New South Wales were segregated from the Grevillea victoriae complex by Peter Olde and Bill Molyneux. Bob Makinson segregated two further species, G. oxyantha and G. rhyolitica, in 1997. Grevillea epicroca, G. irassa and G. monscalana were segregated and G. miqueliana was reinstated as a separate species in the Flora of Australia in 2000. In this publication, Makinson defined a Victoriae Subgroup within the genus Grevillea as follows:

In 2005 Bill Molyneux and Val Stajsic described the new species Grevillea bemboka and  G. callichlaena and the new subspecies G. miqueliana subsp. cincta and elevated G. brevifolia subsp. polychroma to species status (G. polychroma). A new species, Grevillea burrowa, was formally described in 2015.

Grevillea victoriae sensu stricto
There are currently three recognised subspecies in Grevillea victoriae sensu stricto:
G. victoriae subsp. brindabella - newly described in 2010. (synonyms: G. aff. victoriae 'Baldy Range', G. aff. victoriae M.Richardson 9)
G. victoriae subsp. nivalis - Kosciuszko grevillea, which was formally described in 2000 by Stajsic and Molyneux in Taxonomic studies in the Grevillea victoriae F.Muell. species complex.
G. victoriae subsp. victoriae

Distribution and habitat

Grevillea victoriae occurs in rocky, mountainous areas of south-eastern Australia in forest, woodland and heath. Associated tree species include Eucalyptus pauciflora and Eucalyptus delegatensis.
G. victoriae subsp. victoriae is found on some of Victoria's highest mountains including Mount Bogong, Mount Buffalo, Mount Buller, Mount Hotham, Mount Howitt, Mount St Bernard and Mount Torbreck. G. victoriae subsp. nivalis occurs in sub-alpine areas around Mount Kosciuszko and nearby ranges from Mount Gibbo and Mount Sassafras in the Victorian Alps northwards to Talbingo in New South Wales. In rare cases it may be seen above the treeline. G. victoriae subsp. brindabella occurs in the Brindabella Range on the border of New South Wales and the Australian Capital Territory.

Ecology
Eastern spinebills and yellow-faced honeyeaters are known to feed on the nectar of Grevillea victoriae sensu lato. In Kosciuszko National Park, it has been noted that many bird species leave the area when Grevillea victoriae finishes flowering in January 

Taxa within the Grevillea victoriae complex are believed to be fire intolerant, regenerating from seed only.

Conservation status
On the Department of Sustainability and Environment's Advisory List of Rare Or Threatened Plants In Victoria, the subspecies  victoriae is listed as "rare". The subspecies nivalis is currently regarded as endangered.

Cultivation
Grevillea victoriae has a reputation for being hardy and reliable in cultivation, and has been successfully grown in all states of Australia, as well as New Zealand, the United States and Great Britain. Plants require a well-drained position with full-exposure to sun or partial shade and will benefit from pruning to maintain a more compact shape. Originating from mountainous regions, the species has a high tolerance to frost and snow. It is useful as a screening plant and to attract birds to the garden. In certain parts of North America, hummingbirds feed on the flowers of cultivated plants in the winter.

Plants are easily propagated by seed or cuttings and have been successfully grafted on to Grevillea robusta rootstocks.

Cultivars

A number of hybrid cultivars involving Grevillea victoriae sensu lato have been developed including the following:
'Audrey'  - G. juniperina x G. victoriae
'Bairnsdale' -  selected seedling of G. 'Poorinda Constance'
'Canterbury Gold' -  G. juniperina (prostrate yellow form) x G. victoriae var.leptoneura
'Glen Pearl' - G. victoriae x G. juniperina
'Lady O' - G. victoriae hybrid x G. rhyolitica
'Orange Box' -  G. polychroma x G. juniperina subsp. juniperina 
'Poorinda Constance' - New South Wales form of G. juniperina x red flower form of G. victoriae
'Poorinda Golden Lyre' - G. alpina x G. victoriae

References

External links
Herbarium specimen at Royal Botanic Gardens Kew

victoriae
Endemic flora of Australia
Flora of New South Wales
Flora of Victoria (Australia)
Proteales of Australia
Taxa named by Ferdinand von Mueller